Alexander Garden extends along the Moscow Kremlin wall.

Alexander Garden may also refer to:

Other parks 
 Alexander Garden (Saint Petersburg), connects Palace Square and St. Isaac's Cathedral in St. Petersburg
 Alexandrovsky Sad (disambiguation) in several other towns
 Alexander Garden (Novocherkassk), Novocherkassk, Rostov oblast, Russia

People 
 Alexander Garden (priest) (c. 1685–1756), born in Scotland, lived in South Carolina
 Alexander Garden (naturalist) (1730–1791), his son, naturalist and physician, lived in Scotland, South Carolina, and England
 Alexander Garden (soldier) (1757–1829), his son, born and died in South Carolina, educated in England and Scotland
 Alexander Garden (politician) (1714–1785), Scottish politician representing Aberdeenshire; fourth cousin of the soldier
 Alexander Garden (poet) (c. 1585–c. 1642), also known as Alexander Gardyne, lived in Scotland